Shamli is a district in the Indian state of Uttar Pradesh. This district was carved out from Muzaffarnagar District on 28 September 2011 as Prabudh Nagar and renamed Shamli in July 2012. Shamli is the headquarters of the district. Shamli is located along the Delhi-Saharanpur-Dehradun Expressway, Ambala-Shamli Expressway, Gorakhpur-Shamli Expressway, Delhi–Saharanpur (National Highway-709B), Meerut-Karnal (National Highway-709A) and Panipat-Khatima (National Highway-709AD) Highways.

Shamli district comes in National Capital Region of India.

Formation
The district was carved out of Muzaffarnagar district in September 2011 and named Prabudh Nagar. Shamli and Kairana tehsils of Muzaffarnagar formed the new district. It was renamed Shamli in July 2012 by the Uttar Pradesh government.

Geography
Shamli City lies at the intersection of NH 709A, NH 709B and NH 709AD and is within the National Capital Region.

Location

Economy
Shamli city has an agriculture and industry based economy where sugarcane is the main crop. There are three major sugar mills located at Shamli, Un and Thanabhawan. Shamli is known worldwide for its Rim-Axle industry which also got selected under Uttar Pradesh Governments One District One Product Scheme.

It is served by Shamli railway station.

2013 Riots
As in many other districts of western Uttar Pradesh, Shamli also suffered rioting during the 2013 Muzaffarnagar riots. A May 2015 report in India Today said that Shamli and Muzaffarnagar districts were "considered sensitive" ever since the violent riots of August and September 2013.

Demographics
At the time of the 2011 census, Shamli district had a population of 1,273,578. Scheduled Castes made up 141,263 (11.09%) of the population.

At the time of the 2011 Census of India, 88.44% of the population in the district spoke Hindi and 10.97% Urdu as their first language.

Administration

Legislative constituencies
There are three Uttar Pradesh Vidhan Sabha constituencies in Shamli district: Shamli, kairana, and Thanabhawan. All of these are part of Kairana Lok Sabha constituency. The current MLA for Shamli is Prasan Chaudhary, the Lok Sabha MP is Pradeep Choudhary.

Tehsils and blocks
Shamli district is divided into 3 tehsils: Shamli, Kairana, and Oon.

Tehsils
Shamli
Kairana
Oon

Blocks
Shamli
Kairana
Thanabhawan
Kandhla
Oon

Transport

Rail
Single electric line is available from Shamli to Saharanpur and Delhi Shahdara Junction.

Farrukhnagar–Saharanpur Janta Express (Train No. 14545/14546) is the only major express train that runs through, averages a speed of 26 km/hr.

References

 
Districts of Uttar Pradesh